The 2008 JB Group Classic is a women's exhibition (no points for the world ranking can be earned) tennis tournament organized at the beginning of each season.

Seeds

Golden Group draw

Silver Group finals

External links
Official website

JB Group Classic
2008 in Hong Kong sport
Tennis tournaments in Hong Kong
2008 in Chinese tennis
2008 in Hong Kong women's sport